Perdita sexmaculata is a species of bee in the family Andrenidae. It is found in Central America and North America.

Subspecies
These two subspecies belong to the species Perdita sexmaculata:
 Perdita sexmaculata octonaria Timberlake, 1962
 Perdita sexmaculata sexmaculata Cockerell, 1895

References

Further reading

External links

 

Andrenidae
Articles created by Qbugbot
Insects described in 1895